was a Japanese photographer.

Notes

Japanese photographers
1886 births
1972 deaths